The 1899–1900 Yale Bulldogs men's basketball team represented Yale University in intercollegiate basketball during the 1899–1900 season. The team finished the season with a 9–6 record and was retroactively named the national champion by the Premo-Porretta Power Poll.

References

Yale Bulldogs men's basketball seasons
Yale
NCAA Division I men's basketball tournament championship seasons
Yale Bulldogs Men's Basketball Team
Yale Bulldogs Men's Basketball Team